St. Isidore-de-Bellevue is a Fransaskois community in Saskatchewan, Canada, northeast of Saskatoon in the rural municipality of St. Louis No. 431, Saskatchewan.

The hamlet was named Bellevue because of the beautiful view from atop Minnitinas Hill. Today the hamlet consists of a garage, school, church, restaurant, pea cleaning/splitting plant, post office, insurance broker, francophone school, bank, old age home, archive facility, cultural centre and more.

Demographics 

References

External links
Foyer - Bellevue Care Home

Designated places in Saskatchewan
Organized hamlets in Saskatchewan
St. Louis No. 431, Saskatchewan
Division No. 15, Saskatchewan